Thomas Randolph (born October 5, 1970) is a former American football cornerback in the National Football League.

Randolph attended Manhattan High School in Manhattan, Kansas.  He played college football at Kansas State, where he was named to the Associated Press second-team All-American team in 1993.

Randolph was drafted by the New York Giants in the second round of the 1994 NFL Draft.  He played with the Giants from 1994 to 1997.  He subsequently played for the Cincinnati Bengals in 1998 and the Indianapolis Colts in 1999, which was his final year in the NFL.

References

1970 births
Living people
American football cornerbacks
Kansas State Wildcats football players
New York Giants players
Cincinnati Bengals players
Indianapolis Colts players
Sportspeople from Manhattan, Kansas